British author J. K. Rowling, writer of Harry Potter and other Wizarding World works, has garnered attention for her support of the Labour Party under Gordon Brown and her criticism of the party under Jeremy Corbyn, as well as her opposition to the Republican Party under Donald Trump. She opposed Scottish independence in a 2014 referendum and Brexit during the 2016 referendum to leave the European Union.

Since late 2019, Rowling has publicly voiced her opinions on transgender people and related civil rights. These views have been criticised as transphobic by some LGBT rights organisations and some feminists, but have received support from other feminists.

United Kingdom politics 
J. K. Rowling has been a long-time friend of former Prime Minister Gordon Brown and his wife Sarah Brown. In September 2008, Rowling donated £1 million to the Labour Party and commended Brown's commitment to improving the lives of poor families. Rowling praised Brown in a 2009 Time magazine essay saying she "still wanted him in charge". Rowling was critical of Jeremy Corbyn's leadership of the Labour Party.

Scottish 
As a resident of Edinburgh, Rowling was eligible to vote in the 2014 referendum on Scottish independence, and intended to vote "No". She donated £1 million (US$1,694,000) to the Better Together anti-independence campaign, led by former neighbour and friend Alistair Darling, and used the "Death Eaters" characters from her Harry Potter series—who reject wizards unless they have pure blood—as a reference in her explanation of her donation: "However, when people try to make this debate about the purity of your lineage, things start getting a little Death Eaterish for my taste." In Rowling's post-donation blog post in mid-June 2014, she explained that she is "friendly" with members of both campaigns and stated a belief that "there are intelligent, thoughtful people on both sides of this question".

In 2018, Rowling tweeted that she was tired of "blood and soil ethno-nationalists marching with" civic campaigners. She also said that Scottish nationalism "contains traces of bigotry".

Brexit 
Rowling opposed Brexit and campaigned for the United Kingdom to stay in the European Union, in the run up to the referendum to leave the European Union, stating on her website that, "I'm the mongrel product of this European continent and I'm an internationalist. I was raised by a Francophile mother whose family was proud of their part-French heritage .... My values are not contained or proscribed by borders. The absence of a visa when I cross the channel has symbolic value to me. I might not be in my house, but I'm still in my hometown." 

Rowling expressed concern that "racists and bigots" were directing parts of the Leave campaign. In a blog post, she added: "How can a retreat into selfish and insecure individualism be the right response when Europe faces genuine threats, when the bonds that tie us are so powerful, when we have come so far together? How can we hope to conquer the enormous challenges of terrorism and climate change without cooperation and collaboration?"

International politics

United States 
Rowling told a Spanish newspaper in February 2008 that the politics of the United States had negatively impacted not only the US, but the UK as well; she stated that "it is a pity that Clinton and Obama have to be rivals because both are extraordinary."

Rowling advised the 2008 graduating class of Harvard, "the great majority of you belong to the world's only remaining superpower. The way you vote, the way you live, the way you protest, the pressure you bring to bear on your government, has an impact way beyond your borders. That is your privilege, and your burden."

Rowling made analogies between Donald Trump and Voldemort after the Republican presidential candidate called for a ban on Muslims entering the United States on 7 December 2015.

Native American issues
On 7 October 2016, Rowling released on Pottermore four pieces of writing exclusively as an introduction to the film Fantastic Beasts and Where to Find Them, titled History of Magic in North America. It included her fictionalized ideas of "Native American Magic." Her use of Native American religious figures and symbolism from contemporary, living cultures for this work of fiction was met with protests by Native American communities; she was accused of racial insensitivity, violation of intellectual property rights, disrespect and appropriating "Native traditions while erasing Native peoples." While usually friendly and actively engaged with her fanbase on social media, after answering one question about her interpretation of skinwalkers that resulted in "thousands of tweets directed at her about these concerns", The Washington Post wrote that "Native people took to Twitter to voice their disappointment and demand a response from Rowling, who has not answered her detractors online." "She has not addressed it at all." wrote Adrienne Keene, "The silence is noted, and it’s deafening.”

European migrant crisis
In 2015, Rowling expressed support for refugees.

Ukraine
In response to the 2022 Russian invasion of Ukraine, Rowling has publicly expressed support for Ukraine, pledging to match funding for aid to children trapped in orphanages in Ukraine. She also publicly expressed opposition to Russian president Vladimir Putin.

Putin referenced Rowling in his 25 March 2022 speech about "cancel culture" and the ongoing Ukraine invasion.  Rowling then rejected Putin's comparison of Russia's alleged ″cancellation" to the manner in which Rowling had been treated.

Israel
On 22 October 2015, a letter was published in The Guardian signed by Rowling (along with over 150 other figures from arts and politics) opposing the cultural boycott of Israel, and announcing the creation of a network for dialogue, called Culture for Coexistence. Rowling later explained her position in more detail, saying that although she opposed most of Benjamin Netanyahu's actions she did not think the cultural boycott would bring about the removal of Israel's leader or help improve the situation in Israel and Palestine.

Free speech 
Rowling wrote about what it meant to be British saying, "It means a welfare state of which we should be fiercely proud and a tradition of tolerance and free speech we should defend to our last collective breath."

In July 2020, Rowling signed an open letter published in Harper's Magazine titled "A Letter on Justice and Open Debate", with 150 other public figures, largely writers and academics. The letter states in part, "The free exchange of information and ideas, the lifeblood of a liberal society, is daily becoming more constricted", criticises "a vogue for public shaming and ostracism" and "a blinding moral certainty", warns of fear spreading in the arts and media, and denounces President Donald Trump as "a real threat to democracy". The letter sparked much debate about cancel culture (public criticism calling for censure of prominent people over their controversial actions or opinions). Rowling stated she was proud to sign the letter to defend "open debate and freedom of thought and speech".

Objections to the letter included accusations that Rowling and the other signatories had powerful means to publish their opinions, and that it was disingenuous to attempt to silence others who might offer criticism of their views. Some thought that Rowling was trying to specifically suppress criticism about her statements concerning transgender topics. After learning who also signed the letter, Jennifer Finney Boylan expressed regret over her support, and stated she would not have signed had she known who the other signatories were. Rowling then sarcastically tweeted that Boylan should incur public penance for the association with her. 

Stanford Law professor Richard Thompson Ford, a signatory to the letter, stated it should not matter who signed because they do not endorse the entire gamut of viewpoints and deeds of their co-signatories. Writer Bari Weiss said she was proud to stand with Rowling and the other signatories. Several of the signers also defended their letter, saying there is a very diverse group of people supporting their stand against excessive retribution by what they called the "forces of illiberalism".

Transgender rights 

Rowling's responses to proposed changes to UK gender recognition laws and her views on sex and gender have provoked controversy. Her statements have divided feminists; fuelled debates on freedom of speech, academic freedom and cancel culture; and prompted support for transgender people from the literary, arts and culture sectors. Her statements have been deemed transphobic by critics and she has been referred to as a TERF (trans-exclusionary radical feminist) in response to comments she made initially on Twitter. She rejects these characterisations. As her views on the legal status of transgender people came under scrutiny, she received insults and death threats and discussion moved beyond the Twitter community. Some performers and feminists have supported Rowling and condemned hate speech directed at her.

Rowling "liked" a 2018 tweet calling transgender women "men in dresses", which led to criticism and accusations of transphobia by some of her fans. Her spokesperson later told PinkNews, "I'm afraid JK Rowling had a clumsy and middle-aged moment. This is not the first time she has favourited by holding her phone incorrectly." On 19 December 2019, Rowling tweeted her support for Maya Forstater, who lost her employment with the Center for Global Development due to gender-critical views, and is the subject of Maya Forstater v Centre for Global Development (2019). On 6 June 2020, Rowling criticised a Devex article's use of the phrase "people who menstruate" instead of the word women. She tweeted, "If sex isn't real, there's no same-sex attraction. If sex isn't real, the lived reality of women globally is erased", while also saying she was "empathetic to trans people". The media advocacy group GLAAD called the tweets "anti-trans" and "cruel". 

Several actors known for portraying Rowling's characters either criticised her views directly or spoke out in support of trans rights, including Daniel Radcliffe, Emma Watson, Rupert Grint, Eddie Redmayne, Katherine Waterston, Bonnie Wright, Miriam Margolyes, and Katie Leung, as did the fansites MuggleNet and The Leaky Cauldron. Actress Noma Dumezweni initially expressed support for Rowling but rescinded her stance following backlash. Actor Ralph Fiennes defended Rowling, saying of the backlash that the "level of hatred that people express about views that differ from theirs [is] disturbing". Another Potter movie actress, Evanna Lynch, initially expressed criticism of Rowling's views, but later also criticized the backlash against Rowling, saying that people should "give her more grace and listen to her."

Rowling responded to the criticism with an essay on her website. She wrote that many women consider terms like "people who menstruate" to be demeaning. She said she was concerned that girls were transitioning in order to escape womanhood, and said that trans activism was "seeking to erode 'woman' as a political and biological class". She said she was a survivor of domestic abuse and sexual assault, and stated that "When you throw open the doors of bathrooms and changing rooms to any man who believes or feels he's a woman...then you open the door to any and all men who wish to come inside", while stating that most trans people were vulnerable and deserved protection. Following up into who is at risk in women's toilets, Reuters stated that it was trans women who were more vulnerable, and that 200 municipalities which allowed trans people to use women's shelters reported no rise in any violence. Among those who disputed the claims in Rowling's essay were Stonewall; Mermaids, a charity organisation for gender non-conforming children which disputed the notion that trans people are predatory; and CEO of GLAAD Sarah Kate Ellis, who said it could create a dangerous environment for the trans community. Feminist gender theorist Judith Butler considered Rowling's claims to be "a rich fantasy" that did not describe social reality. 

Warner Bros. Entertainment and Universal Studios Parks & Resorts both released statements on 10 June 2020, emphasizing their prioritization of LGBTQ+ inclusion and diversity, but did not directly mention Rowling or her comments towards the trans community. Rowling received support from actors Robbie Coltrane and Brian Cox, and some feminists such as Ayaan Hirsi Ali. The radical feminist Julie Bindel stated that Rowling has always been a feminist and has inspired people "to look into issues of sex-based discrimination". The essay was nominated by Amol Rajan of the BBC for the annual Russell prize for best writing. The broadcaster said it appreciated Rowling's "bravery" for writing the blog despite the reaction it caused, and added that the nomination did not mean the BBC supported Rowling's argument.

In June 2020, the Equality Act was blocked in the U.S. Senate. Republican senator James Lankford cited Rowling's essay as part of his reasoning for opposing the bill. Four authors, including Owl Fisher, resigned in protest from the Blair Partnership, Rowling's literary agency, after the company refused to issue a public statement of support for transgender rights, saying that "freedom of speech can only be upheld if the structural inequalities that hinder equal opportunities for underrepresented groups are challenged and changed." 

In July 2020, following the threat of legal action, British children's news website The Day publicly apologised to Rowling after publishing an article that suggested her comments caused harm to and attacked trans people, made comparisons between Rowling's views and those of Wagner on race and Picasso on women, and called for her work to be boycotted. The publication also agreed to pay an undisclosed sum to a charity of Rowling's choice. Rowling returned her Robert F. Kennedy Human Rights Ripple of Hope Award in August 2020, after RFKHR president Kerry Kennedy called her statements "deeply troubling", "transphobic" and degrading towards trans people. Rowling stated that she was "deeply saddened" to be returning the award, reiterating her admiration for Robert Kennedy, but said that no award "means so much to me that I would forfeit the right to follow the dictates of my own conscience." 

Rowling's novel Troubled Blood was published in 2020, receiving criticism for its portrayal of a murderous man who dresses as a woman when killing. A spokesperson for the charity Mermaids condemned the novel for "tired tropes" that demonise trans people by presenting them as a threat. A review in The Guardian stated the character was "just one of many suspects" and that he is not "portrayed as trans or even called a 'transvestite' by Rowling." In September 2020, a letter in support of Rowling, signed by 58 entertainers and authors, including author Ian McEwan, actress Frances Barber, playwright Tom Stoppard and actor and writer Griff Rhys Jones, was published in The Sunday Times. The letter condemned the "onslaught of abuse" directed at Rowling on social media, describing such behaviour as an "insidious, authoritarian and misogynistic trend". Actor Eddie Redmayne similarly condemned the abuse targeted at Rowling, whilst also condemning the abuse towards trans people. Genderfluid comedian and actor Eddie Izzard stated that she does not consider Rowling transphobic and encouraged people to read Rowling's written work about the topic. In an interview with New Statesman, philosopher and gender theorist Judith Butler agreed that Rowling should not be subject to online abuse, but urged people also to oppose any form of abuse against trans people. 

In a 2021 essay for New Statesman, former British prime minister Tony Blair expressed his belief that Labour would never regain power if it criticised Rowling's views on trans people. In his 2021 Netflix stand-up comedy special The Closer, comedian Dave Chappelle also expressed support for Rowling, declaring himself "Team TERF". Also in 2021, several US quidditch leagues decided to change the name of the sport to "distance themselves from the works of JK Rowling" because of her views and comments.

The 2022 HBO Max special Harry Potter 20th Anniversary: Return to Hogwarts featured only archival interviews from 2019 of Rowling. Critics speculated that failure to record new footage with the cast was due to her views on transgender issues reactions of the series' cast on the topic.  Entertainment Weekly reported that Rowling had been invited to take part in the special, but she felt the archival footage was sufficient, and denied that her decision was related to the controversy on transgender issues. In March 2022, Rowling criticised Labour party leader Keir Starmer who said "trans women are women" both in his personal opinion and according to British law. She accused him of misrepresenting the law and said that "the Labour Party can no longer be counted on to defend women's rights". 

During Lesbian Visibility Week in April 2022, Rowling tweeted a picture of Allison Bailey, captioned "Allison Bailey marches for LGB rights". In response, Linda Riley, who started the new Lesbian Visibility Week in the United Kingdom, distanced herself from Rowling's views on transgender people and accused Rowling of using Lesbian Visibility Week "to stir up hate in our community". Rowling responded to this accusation in a tweet publicly sharing the picture of a transgender woman and commenting on her appearance. 

In May 2022, Rowling criticised an incident where a student was hounded out of her school after questioning a speaker about what defines women. The writer called the treatment of the schoolgirl "utterly shameful", adding, "The girl's crime? Saying 'sex exists'." Education secretary Nadhim Zahawi called the incident "hugely concerning" and "unacceptable". In October 2022, Rowling voiced opposition to the Scottish Gender Recognition Reform Bill aimed at expanding the rights of transgender people, calling Nicola Sturgeon a "destroyer of women's rights". 

In December 2022, Rowling announced that she was opening a sexual assault crisis centre, Beira's Place, for cisgender female victims of sexual violence. The Guardian quoted rape crisis specialists as saying it "would provide much-needed extra provision, because existing services were being overwhelmed by new cases" and noted that "under the Equality Act, services that exclude trans women are lawful if they are proportionate and legitimate". In response to a fan praising this decision, Rowling tweeted "Merry Terfmas". Rowling got further criticised by some for her views and only focusing on supporting people assigned female at birth.

Rowling commented in a 2023 podcast that she "never set out to upset anyone" but was "not uncomfortable with getting off my pedestal." Regarding critics' complaints of Rowling "ruining her legacy", she said, "You could not have misunderstood me more profoundly."

Eating disorders 
In 2006, Rowling criticised skinny models, describing that their "only function in the world appears to be supporting the trade in overpriced handbags and rat-sized dogs". She condemned societal beauty standards in "this skinny-obsessed world" and magazine covers that feature people who are "either seriously ill or suffering from an eating disorder". Rowling was criticised both for her comments on underweight people—hoping her daughters would not become "empty-headed, self-obsessed, emaciated clones"—and for the portrayal of overweight people in Harry Potter; Rowling responded that Harry Potter characters who are "on the plumper side" include "several of my most important, admirable and lovable characters".

Abortion 
In 2017, Rowling expressed her opposition to the Mexico City Policy, when it was reinstated by Donald Trump, and said that she supported abortion rights, especially in underdeveloped countries.

Other

Amnesty International
Rowling's employment at Amnesty International made her realise that "imagination is what allows us to empathise with people who have suffered horribly and to act on their behalf." The danger of inaction, Rowling said, comes from people who "prefer not to exercise their imaginations at all."

Environment
Rowling was recognised in 2007 with the Canadian Order of the Forest after demanding that her books be printed on "eco-friendly" papers.

In 2008, Rowling blocked the Finnish publication of her latest Harry Potter novel on paper from Finland because it lacked the ecologically friendly certification she favours.

Literature 
Rowling joined others in opposing age banding of children's books, signing a 2008 petition stating that the proposal to impose age-guidance ranges is "ill-conceived, damaging to the interests of young readers and highly unlikely to make the slightest difference to sales".

See also 
Politics of Harry Potter

Explanatory notes

References

Citations

Journal and book sources
 
 
 
 
 
 
 

J. K. Rowling
Feminism and transgender
Rowling, J. K.